Ham and Stone is a civil parish in the Stroud district, in the county of Gloucestershire, England. It includes the settlements of Bevington, Ham, Hystfield and Stone. As of 2019, it has a population of 776.

History 
Ham and Stone was a chapelry and tything, it became a civil parish in 1866.

References

External links

Local government web site

Civil parishes in Gloucestershire
Stroud District